Wickham St Paul is a village and civil parish located five miles north of Halstead in the district of Braintree, Essex.

The village, in which some of the houses surround a large open green (with cricket pitch and swings), contains a church, a public house, a part-time post office and a grocery store, part of a large farm shop and pick-your-own establishment. The United Kingdom Census 2001 listed Wickham St Paul to have a population of 330.

References

Villages in Essex
Braintree District